The Socorro red-tailed hawk (Buteo jamaicensis socorroensis) is a subspecies of red-tailed hawk endemic to Socorro Island,  off the west coast of Mexico. This race, which is physically fairly similar to the western red-tailed hawk (B. j. calurus), is not recognized by some authorities because it has a breeding population of perhaps fewer than 20 birds. There are some differences from B. j. calurus, such as their larger, more robust feet (second only among all races to the Mexican Highlands red-tailed hawk, B. j. hadropus) and much greater sexual dimorphism, which is the most pronounced of any race linearly, averaging 10.42% when all standard measurements are considered. Furthermore, Socorro hawks tend to average more melantic in overall color, being a duller, darker brown than mainland birds.

References 

Socorro red-tailed hawk